Wayne Caldwell (born June 1, 1948) is an American novelist and poet.

Biography 

Wayne Caldwell was born and raised in Asheville, North Carolina, which is the setting for much of his fictional work.

Caldwell attended the University of North Carolina as an undergraduate, Appalachian State University for his Master's program, and in 1973 he earned a Ph.D. in English Literature at Duke University.

After teaching English at North Carolina Central University in Durham, North Carolina and Union College in Schenectady, New York, Caldwell returned to Asheville.

He began writing works of fiction in the late 1990s.

Bibliography

Novels
Cataloochee (2007), Random House
Requiem by Fire (2010), Random House

Poetry
Woodsmoke (2021), Blair

Other Works
The Pact, Carolina Alumni Review, (July/August 1999).
It Was Crows, Our State, (November 2000).
Typology at Lowe’s: Judges 16:1-3, Theology Today, (January 2001).
The Burning Tree, Now & Then, (Summer 2001).
Hangover, The Village Rambler, (May/June 2004).
Wolfe and Krazy Kat, The Thomas Wolfe Review, Vol. 32 (2008).

References

External links 
 Official Website
 Random House Author Spotlight

1948 births
Living people
21st-century American novelists
Novelists from North Carolina
American male novelists
21st-century American male writers